Patrick Robert Wyrick (born March 11, 1981) is a United States district judge of the United States District Court for the Western District of Oklahoma and a former Associate Justice of the Oklahoma Supreme Court.

Wyrick previously served as Solicitor General in the Office of the Oklahoma Attorney General from 2011 to 2017.

Education and early career 

Wyrick was born in Denison, Texas, and raised in Atoka, Oklahoma, where he graduated from Atoka High School. He earned a Bachelor of Arts degree from the University of Oklahoma in 2004, majoring in sociology and criminology, and received a law degree from the University of Oklahoma College of Law in 2007. Wyrick clerked for Judge James H. Payne of the United States District Court for the Eastern District of Oklahoma from 2007–2008.

Wyrick was an associate at the Oklahoma City law firm GableGotwals from 2008 to 2011, when he was hired by the office of Oklahoma Attorney General Scott Pruitt to become the state's first solicitor general. Wyrick argued on behalf of the state in numerous cases before the Oklahoma Supreme Court and in federal courts. Notably, he argued before the U.S. Supreme Court in the lethal injection case Glossip v. Gross (2015), where the court ruled in Oklahoma's favor by a 5–4 vote. Justices Sonia Sotomayor and Elena Kagan questioned Wyrick "forcefully" and "intensely" during oral arguments in the case.

State judicial service 

Oklahoma Supreme Court justice Steven W. Taylor retired on December 31, 2016. The Oklahoma Judicial Nominating Commission submitted three names of potential nominees to replace Taylor to Governor Mary Fallin. Wyrick and two Oklahoma district court judges, Mark Campbell and Jonathan Sullivan, were nominated by the commission. Fallin selected Wyrick for the vacancy, and he was appointed on February 9, 2017. He was elected Vice Chief Justice on November 15, 2018, for a term starting January 1, 2019. His tenure as an associate justice ended on April 10, 2019, when he received his commission as a federal district judge.

The American Civil Liberties Union (ACLU) of Oklahoma, acting on behalf of two Oklahoma residents, filed a lawsuit challenging Wyrick's appointment, arguing that he did not meet residency requirements for his judgeship. The Oklahoma Supreme Court dismissed the lawsuit on the grounds that the two residents lacked standing to sue.

On November 17, 2017, Wyrick was named by President Donald Trump as a potential nominee to the Supreme Court of the United States.

Wyrick ran in the retention election in November 2018 for a new six-year term. He was retained, with 62% of voters voting to retain him.

Federal judicial service 

On April 10, 2018, President Donald Trump nominated Wyrick to serve as a United States District Judge of the United States District Court for the Western District of Oklahoma. He was nominated to the seat vacated by Judge David Lynn Russell, who assumed senior status on July 7, 2013. On May 23, 2018, a hearing on his nomination was held before the Senate Judiciary Committee. On June 14, 2018, his nomination was reported out of committee by an 11–10 vote.

On January 3, 2019, his nomination was returned to the President under Rule XXXI, Paragraph 6 of the United States Senate. On January 23, 2019, President Trump announced his intent to renominate Wyrick for a federal judgeship. His nomination was sent to the Senate later that day. On February 7, 2019, his nomination was reported out of committee by a 12–10 vote. On April 9, 2019, the Senate voted to invoke cloture on his nomination by a 53–46 vote. He was confirmed later that day by a 53–47 vote. He received his judicial commission on April 10, 2019.

On February 3, 2023, he dismissed an indictment against a man who was charged with violating the federal ban on owning a firearm and using marijuana, ruling that the ban was unconstitutional in the wake of New York State Rifle and Pistol Association v. Bruen.

Memberships 

He has been a member of the Federalist Society since approximately 2011.

Electoral history 
2018

See also 
 Donald Trump Supreme Court candidates
 Donald Trump judicial appointment controversies

References

External links 
 
 Appearances at the U.S. Supreme Court from the Oyez Project
 
 Questionnaire for Judicial Nominees for the United States Senate Committee on the Judiciary
 Contributor profile from the Federalist Society

|-

|-

1981 births
Living people
21st-century American lawyers
21st-century American judges
Federalist Society members
Judges of the United States District Court for the Western District of Oklahoma
Oklahoma lawyers
Justices of the Oklahoma Supreme Court
People from Atoka, Oklahoma
Solicitors General of Oklahoma
United States district court judges appointed by Donald Trump
University of Oklahoma alumni
University of Oklahoma College of Law alumni